Claybaugh Creek is a stream in the Saint Francois Mountains of Iron County in the U.S. state of Missouri.

Claybaugh Creek has the name of an early charcoal producer.

See also
List of rivers of Missouri

References

Rivers of Iron County, Missouri
Rivers of Missouri